The 1974 season was Molde's first year back in the top flight after their promotion from the 1973 2. divisjon, and their 3rd season in total in the top flight of Norwegian football.

This season, Molde competed in 1. divisjon and the 1974 Norwegian Football Cup. Molde finished as runners-up in the league, one point behind winners Viking.

Season events

Squad
Source:

Friendlies

Competitions

1. divisjon

Results summary 

Source:

Positions by round

Results

Table

Norwegian Cup

Squad statistics

Goal scorers

See also
Molde FK seasons

References

1974
Molde